ISAF may refer to:
 International Sailing Federation, former name for the world governing body for Olympic and other competitive sailing, now called World Sailing
 International Security Assistance Force, the NATO-led security mission operating in Afghanistan from 2001 to 2014
 International Shark Attack File, a global database of shark attacks set up in the 1940s, now maintained by the American Elasmobranch Society
 International Symposium on Alcohol Fuels, an international bi-annual conference on alcohol and bio-fuels, established in 1976
 Independent State Allied Forces, a fictional military alliance in the 2001 video game, Ace Combat 04: Shattered Skies